Kaagaz is a 2021 Indian biographical comedy film written and directed by Satish Kaushik and produced by Salman Khan and Nishant Kaushik under the banner of Salman Khan Films and The Satish Kaushik Entertainment Production. The film stars Pankaj Tripathi and Monal Gajjar with Amar Upadhyay who plays the main antagonist. The plot of the film is based on the life and struggle of Lal Bihari, a farmer from the small village of Amilo Mubarakpur, who was declared dead on official papers. It marked the last directorial venture of Kaushik before his death on 9 March 2023.

Synopsis
The film depicts the struggle and fight of Bharat Lal Bihari against the Indian bureaucracy who was declared dead on government records, his fight with the government went on for 19 years. This story is based on true event of Santosh Murat Singh life, he claimed his relatives declared his dead on administration papers after he married with a dalit girl.

Cast
Pankaj Tripathi as Bharatlal Bihari
Monal Gajjar as Rukmanii
Satish Kaushik as Advocate Sadhoram Kewat
Mita Vashisht as MLA Asarfi Devi
Brijendra Kala as Highcourt Judge
Amar Upadhyay as MLA Vidhayak Jaganpal Singh
Lankesh Bhardwaj as Sr. Inspector
Neha Chauhan as Journalist Sonia
Garrvil Mohan as Pablo 
Pranay Narayan as Devilal
Amit Pathak as Harilal
Sharat Sonu as Rampal
Ratan Lal as Motiya
Mahesh Chandra Deva as typist
Arun Shekhar as Chaman Lal
Dinesh Sharma as Panditji Pandey
Yogesh Kumar Shukla as Shukla Ji
Sandeepa Dhar Special appearance in Laalam Laal song
 Ajay Singh as Tyagi peshkaar of High court judge
 Lal Bihari in a cameo appearance as the man cycling beside Bharatlal

Soundtrack 

The film's music was composed by Pravesh Mallick, Rahul Jain and ceAzer while lyrics written by Aseem Ahmed Abbasee, Rashmi Virag, Kunaal Vermaa and Shweta Raj.

Release 
Film production was nearly complete before being put on hold because of the COVID-19 pandemic.  The trailer was released on December 24, 2020. It premiered on 7 January 2021 on ZEE5.

Reception

Critical reception 
Manoj Vashisth of Dainik Jagran and Neeraj Verma of Navbharat Times had given the film three and half stars out of five. Akanksha Sridhara of Xappie also gives three and half stars out of five to the film.

Pallabi Dey Purkayastha of The Times of India had given the film three stars out of five by summing with 'Kaagaz' could have been the go-to movie for those seeking a burst of inspiration, but it ends up being a uni-dimensional masterclass on one man's acting prowess".

Saibal Chatterjee of NDTV had given the film three stars concluding "Satish Kaushik plays a more extended role with customary aplomb. It is however left to Pankaj Tripathi to keep Kaagaz afloat even when it appears to be wilting a touch under the burden of its solemn purpose. He doesn't let the film down."

Gautaman Bhaskaran of News18 had given the film two and half stars out of five stating that Kaagaz is a satire narrated with sincerity and passion, and takes on the bureaucracy by its horns, so to say. The film is a movingly powerful reflection of how India's poor continue to be treated even today – almost 74 years after the country won its independence from decades of foreign dominance, first by the Mughals and then British. In a way, India's poor, most of whom live away from urban conglomerations, remain as poor as they were and still face the brunt of a largely unfeeling and corrupt administration.

Umesh Punwani from Koimoi rated the movie three stars stating, "Pankaj Tripathi acts as the paper-weight holding every aspect of this story together. His scope of acting helps us to establish a connect which remains throughout the film."

References

External links
 Kaagaz on ZEE5

Films directed by Satish Kaushik
Films postponed due to the COVID-19 pandemic
ZEE5 original films
2020s biographical films
2020s Hindi-language films